Clement Andrew Crisp OBE (21 September 1926 – 1 March 2022) was a British dance critic. He served as dance critic for the Financial Times from 1956 to 2020.

Life and career
Crisp was born in Romford, Essex, in 1926, although for many years he claimed that he was born in 1931. He first became interested in ballet after seeing a performance of Swan Lake as a child. After attending Oxted School, he spent a year in Bordeaux, France, before studying at Keble College, Oxford. For many years he taught French before becoming dance critic for the Financial Times in 1956. He also served as dance critic of The Spectator in the 1960s. His focus was on ballet, having discovered it as a teenager during the Second World War when his parents took him to the Sadler's Wells Ballet, though he also wrote about other forms of dance and had wide-ranging interests.

Crisp was the author or co-author of 17 books on dance and dance history, including Ballet: An Illustrated History, co-written with Mary Clarke and published in 1973. In 2021 a collection of his reviews, entitled Six Decades of Dance, was published. 

He was also librarian and archivist of the Royal Academy of Dance for many years.

Crisp died on 1 March 2022, at the age of 95.

Awards
Crisp was awarded the Queen Elizabeth II Coronation Award in 1992. In the same year he was made a Knight of the Order of the Dannebrog (Denmark). In 2003, Dance Research published a special Golden Jubilee edition of his work. In 2005, he was awarded the Order of the British Empire (OBE) in the Birthday Honours "for services to ballet".

Books
Crisp's works included:
Ballet: An Illustrated History (with M. Clarke, London, 1973, revised edition, 1992)
Ballet for All (with P. Brinson, London, 1970, revised edition, 1980)
Making a Ballet (with Clarke, London, 1974)
Ballet in Art (with Clarke, 1976)
Design for Ballet (with Clarke, London, 1978)
Introducing Ballet (with Clarke, 1978)
History of Dance (with Clarke, London, 1981)
The Balletgoer's Guide (with Clarke, 1981)
Dancer (with Clarke, 1984)
Ballerina (with Clarke, 1987)

References

1926 births
2022 deaths
Alumni of Keble College, Oxford
Ballet critics
Financial Times people
Dance in England
Librarians from London
English archivists
English male non-fiction writers
Knights of the Order of the Dannebrog
Officers of the Order of the British Empire
20th-century British people
21st-century British people